Anochetus goodmani is a species of ant in the subfamily Ponerinae.

References

External links

Ponerinae
Insects described in 2008